The 2021 season was Terengganu's fourth season in the Malaysia Super League since the rebranding in 2017.

Players

Coaching staff

Transfers

Transfers in
Pre-season

Mid-season

From youth squad

Transfers out
Pre-season

Mid-season

Retained

Friendlies
JDT Invitation Cup (19-25 February 2021)

Others

Terengganu II
Shah Alam City Cup (19–23 February 2021)

Others

Competitions

Malaysia Super League

League table

Matches

Malaysia Cup

Group stage

The draw for the group stage was held on 15 September 2021.

Knockout stage

Quarter-finals

Semi-finals

AFC Cup

On 11 November 2020, the AFC approved a new calendar for the competition due to the COVID-19 pandemic, where the group stage is played as centralized single round-robin tournament, and the preliminary round, play-off round, and ASEAN Zone semi-finals and final are played as a single match.

Teams from ASEAN Zone will not compete in the knockout stage, due to the cancellation of group stage matches in ASEAN Zone.

Statistics

Appearances and goals
Players with no appearances not included in the list.

|-

|-

|-

|-

|-

|-

|-

|-

|-

|-

|-

|-

|-

|-

|-

|-

|-

|-

|-

|-

|-

|-

|-

|-

|-

|-

|-

|-

|-

|-

|-

|-

|-

|-

|-

|-
! colspan="16" style="background:#dcdcdc; text-align:center"| Players transferred out during the season

|-

|-

|}

Terengganu FC II

Appearances and goals

Players with no appearances not included in the list.

|-

|}

Clean sheets

References

Terengganu FC seasons
Terengganu
Malaysian football club seasons by club